Jettison may refer to:

 Jettison (shipping), cargo discarded from a ship or wreckage
 Jettison (aviation), an aviation term to discard fuel or weapons in flight by use of a mechanism, switch or handle
Fuel jettison, a procedure used by aircraft in certain emergency situations

Entertainment 
 Jettison (album), an album by Chicago punk rock band Naked Raygun, released in 1988
 Jettison, a play by actor Brendan Bradley
 "Jettison", a song from the album The Virginian by Neko Case
 Jettison (record label), a Chicago-based indie record label owned by Jeff Pezzati of Naked Raygun
 Jettison (Steady Ground album), an album by Alternative Rock band Steady Ground, released in 2007
 Jettison (band), a punk band from the 1980s
 Jettison (book), a book written by D.E. White

See also 
 The Jetsons